Judge Hardy's Children is a 1938 film in the Andy Hardy series. The plot involves the Hardys visiting Washington, DC, in this third entry in MGM's "Hardy Family" series.

Plot summary

Judge Hardy (Lewis Stone) has been appointed chairman of a special committee in Washington, DC. The Judge's daughter Marian (Cecilia Parker) is intoxicated by Washington's social life, while son Andy (Mickey Rooney) falls for a pretty daughter of a French diplomat. Thus, the judge is obliged to juggle his committee duties with his efforts to keep his children from making fools of themselves.

Cast

 Mickey Rooney as Andy Hardy
 Lewis Stone as Judge James K. Hardy
 Fay Holden as Mrs. Emily Hardy
 Cecilia Parker as Marian Hardy
 Betty Ross Clarke as Aunt Millie Forrest
 Ann Rutherford as Polly Benedict
 Robert Whitney as Wayne Trenton
 Jacqueline Laurent as Suzanne Cortot
 Ruth Hussey as Margaret 'Maggie' Lee
 Jonathan Hale as John Lee
 Janet Beecher as Miss Budge, Suzanne's Tutor
 Leonard Penn as Steve Prentiss
 Boyd Crawford as Radio Announcer

References

External links
 Judge Hardy's Children at IMDb
 Judge Hardy's Children at Andy Hardy website
 Judge Hardy's Children at TCMDB
 
 

1938 films
1938 comedy films
American comedy films
American black-and-white films
Films directed by George B. Seitz
Films set in Washington, D.C.
Metro-Goldwyn-Mayer films
1930s English-language films
1930s American films